The following table is a list of films produced in Denmark or in the Danish language during the 2010s (decade). For an alphabetical list of all Danish films currently on wikipedia see :Category:Danish films. For Danish films from other decades see the Cinema of Denmark box above.

External links
 Danish film at the Internet Movie Database
 Danish films 2010-2014 at [The Filmtransition]
 Danish film in numbers - 2013 at the [Danish Film institute]

2010s
Films
Danish